Argythamnia proctorii, the Cayman silverbush, is a species of silverbush that is endemic to the Cayman Islands. It is widespread in the forests of all three Cayman Islands, and its population is estimated to be 428,000 mature individuals. It is an erect, wiry-stemmed plant growing to about 1.5 m tall. It is monoecious, and seed capsules are produced year-round. When the seed capsules are ripe, they dry and explode, scattering the seeds.

References

Chrozophoreae
Endemic flora of the Cayman Islands
Plants described in 1967